KH-13 is an unofficial designation which may refer to several US reconnaissance satellite programmes; a continuation of the Key Hole series which officially ended at KH-11:
Misty (classified project)
Enhanced Imaging System
Future Imagery Architecture
Any successor to the KH-11 satellites

Others uses:
 KH-13 is the ISO 3166-2 code for Cambodia's Preah Vihear Province